Cezar E. McKnight is an American politician. He is a former member of the South Carolina House of Representatives from the 101st District, serving since 2014. He is a member of the Democratic party.

In January 2022, McKnight made headlines after he introduced a bill named after George Stinney, a 14-year old black boy who was wrongfully executed in 1944, titled the George Stinney Fund, which would make the state of South Carolina pay $10 million to the families of the wrongfully executed if their conviction is posthumously overturned.

McKnight was defeated in the 2022 June Democratic Primary by Democrat Roger K. Kirby.

Electoral history

References

External links 

Living people
1973 births
Democratic Party members of the South Carolina House of Representatives
21st-century American politicians
African-American people in South Carolina politics
Morris Brown College alumni
21st-century African-American politicians
20th-century African-American people